Flight 101 is an airline flight number with multiple accidents and incidents. It may refer to the following aviation accidents:

 National Airlines Flight 101, a Douglas DC-6 which crashed on 11 February 1952, due failing propeller after take-off from Newark Airport
 Aeroflot Flight 20/101, an Ilyushin Il-18 which crashed due to low visibility on 3 January 1965, near Alma-Ata Airport
 Air India Flight 101, a Boeing 707 which accidentally flew into Mont Blanc in France on 24 January 1966
 TABSO Flight 101, an Ilyushin Il-18 which crashed on 24 November 1966, near Bratislava in Slovakia
 Aeroflot Flight 101/435, an Antonov An-24 which was hijacked by the co-pilot on 19 December 1985
 Fine Air Flight 101, a McDonnell Douglas DC-8 which crashed on 7 August 1997 after take-off from Miami
 Flightline Flight 101, a Swearingen Metroliner which crashed on 10 October, 2001
 Chalk's Ocean Airways Flight 101, a Grumman G-73 Mullard which crashed on 19 December 2005 in Miami
 Yeti Airlines Flight 101, a DHC-6 Twin Otter, that Crashed on final approach on 8 October 2008

 Polish Air Force Flight 101, a Tupolev Tu-154, which crashed on approach on 10 April 2010
Agni Air Flight 101, a Dornier 228 which crashed on 24 August 2010 after take-off from Kathmandu

See also
 Flight 1 / 001 (disambiguation)

0101